The 5th Annual Streamy Awards was the 5th installment of the Streamy Awards honoring streaming television series. The awards were held on September 17, 2015, at the Hollywood Palladium in Hollywood, California. They were hosted by the YouTube stars Grace Helbig and Tyler Oakley. Broadcast live on VH1 and simultaneously livestreamed online, the 5th Streamy Awards were the first to be televised. Several new award categories were added for the 5th Streamys, including new Social Video awards for content on Instagram, Snapchat, and Vine, new subject categories such as Lifestyle and Documentary or Investigative, and Breakout Creator and Breakthrough Artist which were created to celebrate up-and-coming creators. The show had a positive reception in media publications and on social media.

Performers 
The 5th Annual Streamy Awards featured the musical performances of the following artists:

Winners and nominees 

The nominees were announced on August 12, 2015 and the finalists for the Audience Choice Award categories were announced on September 3. 35 of the categories were announced on September 14 during the Official Streamys Nominee Reception at the YouTube Space LA. The remaining nine "marquee categories" were announced during the main ceremony at the Hollywood Palladium on September 17. Winners of the categories were selected by the Streamys Blue Ribbon Panel except for the Audience Choice awards which were put to a public vote.

Winners are listed first, in bold.

Web series with multiple nominations and awards

Reception 
Rae Votta of The Daily Dot praised the video segments that introduced each award category for the unique spin that was added to each video by the various online content creators which produced them. Votta also felt that the imposition of a strict runtime due to the event being televised made the show flow better when compared to previous years. The musical performances were well received, particularly Future's performance of "March Madness" which was praised by writers for Spin, Vulture, MTV News, and Vice. Hailee Steinfeld also received praise for her performance by Teen Vogue. Votta called the performances "flashy and impressive" but felt that they were disconnected from YouTube and online content creation. Writing for MTV News, Deepa Lakshmin praised Lilly Singh's acceptance speech in which she said "Lastly I want to say huge, huge shout-out to Google and YouTube for not being scared to put a brown girl on a billboard." Lakshmin called the speech "badass" and felt that it was especially meaningful for Indian fans of Singh's.

Reception of the event on social media was positive according to analysis done by the social TV platform Canvs, using data from Nielsen Twitter TV ratings, which found that an estimated 41.5% of reaction tweets to the event contained the emotion of "love" and 16.2% the reaction "congrats". According to Nielsen, the show was the leading social non-sports program on television the day it aired.

References 

Streamy Awards
Streamy Awards
2015 in American television
Streamy
2015 in Internet culture